Cryptomedasina is a genus of moths in the family Geometridae described by Sato in 1995.

Species
Cryptomedasina nagaii Sato, 1995
Cryptomedasina vandenberghi Prout, 1928

References

Boarmiini